Henri Gourarier  is a French Holocaust survivor.

Early life 
Gourarier was born in 1928 in Berlin. His father is a native of Lodz in Poland and was employed at Siemens and Halske. His mother was born in Przemysl, Poland. Henri Gourarier's parents owned a men's clothing store in Berlin.

Internee 
Gourarier was deported to a concentration camp in September 1943, and then to Auschwitz. His mother and uncle Oscar were gassed on arrival at Auschwitz on 6 November 1943. Henri was contained in his mother's hometown, Przemysl, which was turned into a Nazi ghetto. He was finally deported with his family in 1943 to Auschwitz-Birkenau concentration camp with the number 161397 tattooed on his arm (his father had 161396), then to Buchenwald and finally to the plant Spaichingen (Baden-Württemberg). Though exhausted, he managed to escape during a forced march in 1945.

Career 
He was repatriated to Nice on 14 July 1945. In 1947, he reached Israel by sea in a small boat as did his future wife: Michelle Gourarier (born 20 February 1928). He passing the Exodus, a ship on which thousands of Jewish survivors of camps vainly tried to reach the Palestine. Henri and Michelle shared a community life at Kibbutz Neve Ilan. On their 2nd anniversary, their child Zeev was born (b. 1953).

In 1955, he returned to France and worked as an engineer till his retirement. He was active in organizations defending human rights. He is a member of the International Federation of Human Rights (FIDH).

Henri Gourarier was knighted in the French Order of Merit on 16 December 1990. He was knighted in the Legion of Honor on 15 April 2016.

Family 
Zeev Gourarier (born 1953 in Jerusalem) is the Scientific Director and civilizations of the museum's collections of Europe and Méditerranée. Laurent Gourarier (born 28 April 1961 in Paris) is a psychiatrist specializing in addiction in Paris.

Memory 
 Autobiography printed in "Descelle mes lèvres" 2006 

Book

Sources
SAVED SKIN
Voir, (en) Henri Gourarier. USC Shoah Foundation Institute testimony of Henri Gourarier. United States Holocaust Memorial Museum.
 « Rencontre avec Michelle Jacoby et Henri Gourarier, passagers de l'Exodus », sur Cercle Bernard Lazare, Grenoble, 15 mai 2008
Nous étions l'Exodus film documentaire de Jean-Michel Vecchiet, 2007
Jean-Paul Soulié, « Les observateurs ne savent plus où donner de la tête », Montréal, La Presse, 24 août 1990

References

French people of Polish descent
1928 births
Living people
French emigrants to Mandatory Palestine